The Taiping Kingdom History Museum is a museum dedicated to artifacts from the Taiping Rebellion (1851-1864). It is located on the grounds of the Zhan Yuan Garden, a historical garden in Nanjing, China.

History
The garden that surrounds the museum was once "Enthusiasm Garden" or "Zhan Garden" of the first ruler of the Ming Dynasty, Hongwu (1328-1398).  In 1853,  it became the residence of Yang Xiuqing, a military leader in the Taiping Rebellion. During the rebellion, Nanjing was captured by the rebels and used as its headquarters. They acquired large portions of land throughout China. At Beijing, the Qing Dynasty narrowly defeated the rebels in 1864, but it ended the war.

Museum
In 1958, it became the site of the current museum.  The museum has artifacts from the rebellion, including: Taiping currency, weapons, uniforms, and documents about the Taiping Heavenly Kingdom ideology, which was based upon an idiosyncratic version of Christianity. Hong Xiuquan believed he was Christ's younger brother, ordered by God to exterminate China's Manchu rulers, whom he decried as demons.

Gallery

See also
 List of museums in China

References

External links

Museums in Nanjing
History museums in China